The 1987 Syracuse Orangemen football team represented Syracuse University in the 1987 NCAA Division I-A football season. The Orangemen were led by seventh-year head coach Dick MacPherson and played their home games at the Carrier Dome in Syracuse, New York. The team finished 11–0–1 and tied Auburn in the 1988 Sugar Bowl. The 11 wins by the Orangemen matched the school record set by the national champion 1959 team, and their 4th-ranked finish in the AP Poll was the first ranked finish since 1961.

Schedule

1987 team players in the NFL

Awards and honors
Dick MacPherson, Bobby Dodd Coach of the Year Award
Dick MacPherson, Eddie Robinson Coach of the Year Award
Dick MacPherson, Paul Bear Bryant Award
Dick MacPherson, Walter Camp Coach of the Year Award
Don McPherson, Sammy Baugh Trophy
Don McPherson, Maxwell Award
Don McPherson, Davey O’Brien Award
Don McPherson, Johnny Unitas Golden Arm Award
Don McPherson, Second in Heisman Trophy voting
Don McPherson, unanimous first team All-American (AP, UPI, AFCA, FWAA, WCF, SN)
Ted Gregory, consensus first team All-American (FWAA, UPI, SN, FN, PFW)
Tommy Kane, Sporting News second team All-American

References

Syracuse
Syracuse Orange football seasons
Sugar Bowl champion seasons
Lambert-Meadowlands Trophy seasons
College football undefeated seasons
Syracuse Orangemen football